Forrest Murrell Blue Jr. (September 7, 1945 – July 16, 2011) was an offensive lineman who spent eleven seasons in the National Football League (NFL) with the San Francisco 49ers (1968–1974) and Baltimore Colts (1975–1978).

Blue was born in Marfa, Texas on September 7, 1945. He spent his teenage years in Tampa, Florida where his family moved after his father, a United States Army captain, retired there. A 1963 graduate of George D. Chamberlain High School, he made the National Honor Society and starred on the varsity teams in football, baseball, track and basketball. He was a member of the Florida High School Activities Association (FHSAA) Class AA football champions in 1961. He eventually was inducted into the Tampa Sports Hall of Fame in 1993 and named the sixth-best football player ever from Hillsborough County by the St. Petersburg Times in 1999.

Blue was a three-year letterman as a center for Ralph "Shug" Jordan at Auburn University from 1965 through 1967. He played for the College All-Stars in its 34–17 defeat to the Green Bay Packers at Soldier Field on August 2, 1968.

Selected 15th overall in the 1968 NFL Draft by the San Francisco 49ers out of Auburn University, Blue helped the team win three straight division titles, and was named an All-Pro three times.

Blue died at an assisted living facility in Carmichael, California of chronic traumatic encephalopathy.

In May 2013, he was posthumously inducted into the Alabama Sports Hall of Fame.

A large number of former American football (NFL) players have been diagnosed with or have had chronic traumatic encephalopathy, or CTE. A definitive diagnosis so far can be made only post-mortem.

References

External links
 Gallery of Forrest Blue football cards
 Forrest Blue at Pro Football Reference
 Forrest Blue at Database Football

1945 births
2011 deaths
American football players with chronic traumatic encephalopathy
Auburn Tigers football players
Baltimore Colts players
George D. Chamberlain High School alumni
National Conference Pro Bowl players
People from Marfa, Texas
Players of American football from Texas
San Francisco 49ers players
Deaths from dementia in California